The International Pfeffer Peace Award or Pfeffer Peace Award is one of the three peace awards presented by the United States Fellowship of Reconciliation (United States) (FOR), along with the Martin Luther King Jr. Award and the Nyack Area Peace Award. Since 1989, it has been awarded annually to "individuals or organizations whose commitment to peace, justice, and reconciliation is recognized as extraordinary."

Background
The International Pfeffer Peace Award was established at the end of the 1980s by Leo and Freda Pfeffer to acknowledge and honour leaders and activists who work globally for peace and justice. Leo Pfeffer (24 December 1910 – 4 June 1993) was the United States' leading theoretician on religious liberty and the separation of church and state, and he argued these constitutional issues before the Supreme Court. Along with his wife Freda Pfeffer (5 September 1911 – 3 November 2013) he founded FOR USA's International Pfeffer Peace Award in 1989, when they also began co-sponsoring FOR USA's National Martin Luther King Jr. Peace Award which was established to recognize persons or groups working in the United States in the tradition of Martin Luther King Jr. Following Leo's death in 1993, his son Alan Pfeffer took the reins in managing his parents' endowment.

Recipients

2016 - Mães de Maio of São Paulo, Brazil
2015 - Combatants for Peace
2014 - Widad Akrawi
2013 - International Council of Thirteen Indigenous Grandmothers
2012 - Dr. Hakim
2011 - Sonal Ambani
2010 - Scott Kennedy
2009 - La’Onf network of Iraqi nonviolence communities 
2008 - Ricardo Esquivia
2007 - Mel Duncan and the Nonviolent Peaceforce
2006 - Caribbean Project for Peace and Justice
2005 - George Houser
2002 - Wanida Tantiwittayappitak
2000 - Pierre Marchand
1999 - Kathy Kelly 
1998 - The Peace Community of San José de Apartadó
1997 - Dorothy Granada
1996 - Peace Brigades International
1995 - Palestinian Center for Rapprochement between Peoples
1994 - Muhammad Yunus 
1993 - José Gómez Izquierdo
1992 - Interns for Peace
1991 - Anita Kromberg and Richard Steele
1990 - Hildegard Goss-Mayr and Diana Francis
1989 - Donald Mosley

See also
 List of peace prizes
 List of peace activists

References

Peace awards
Fellowship of Reconciliation